Ota Zaremba (born 22 April 1957) is a Czechoslovak weightlifter, Olympic champion and world champion. He won gold medal in the heavyweight I class at the 1980 Summer Olympics in Moscow.

After he ended his career, Zaremba admitted he used doping throughout his career with the acknowledgment of the sport officials and coaches.

In 2010 Zaremba entered to the far-right Workers' Party of Social Justice (DSSS).

References

1957 births
Living people
People from Havířov
Czech male weightlifters
Czechoslovak male weightlifters
Weightlifters at the 1980 Summer Olympics
Olympic weightlifters of Czechoslovakia
Olympic gold medalists for Czechoslovakia
Czech sportspeople in doping cases
Doping cases in weightlifting
Olympic medalists in weightlifting
Medalists at the 1980 Summer Olympics
World Weightlifting Championships medalists
Sportspeople from the Moravian-Silesian Region
Workers' Party of Social Justice politicians